Events in the year 2009 in Gabon.

Incumbents 

 President: Omar Bongo Ondimba (until 8 June), Didjob Divungi Di Ndinge (from 6 May until 10 June), Rose Francine Rogombé (from 10 June until 16 October), Ali Bongo Ondimba (from 16 October)
 Prime Minister: Jean Eyeghé Ndong (until 17 July), Paul Biyoghé Mba (from 17 July)

Events 

 June 8 – The second President of Gabon, Omar Bongo, died in Spain after having suffered from colorectal cancer.

Deaths 

 June 8 – Omar Bongo, 2nd President of Gabon (b. 1935)

References 

 
2000s in Gabon
Years of the 21st century in Gabon
Gabon